The Our Lady of Perpetual Help Roman Catholic Church, located in Cottage Grove, Oregon, is listed on the National Register of Historic Places.

See also
 National Register of Historic Places listings in Lane County, Oregon

References

Buildings and structures in Cottage Grove, Oregon
National Register of Historic Places in Lane County, Oregon
Churches on the National Register of Historic Places in Oregon
Roman Catholic Archdiocese of Portland in Oregon
Roman Catholic churches in Oregon